Bandar Bukit Mahkota is a new township in Bangi, Hulu Langat District, Selangor, Malaysia.

Bandar Bukit Mahkota is a  development near the border of Selangor and Negeri Sembilan. Nearest to the township are Seri Putra and Bandar Puteri Bangi at Selangor side and Nilai Industrial Park at Negeri Sembilan side.

It is close to key tertiary institutions, like University Putra Malaysia, Islamic Science University of Malaysia (Universiti Sains Islam Malaysia), National University of Malaysia (University Kebangsaan Malaysia, UKM), Universiti Tenaga Nasional (UNITEN), Inti International University, Nilai University College, etc.

Soon, Bandar Bukit Mahkota will have her own Mosque, namely Masjid At-Taqwa near roundabout to Section 5, and 6. Currently prayers are performed at Surau Ar-Raudhah Section 5 as well as at Masjid Al-Azhar KUIS nearby.

Accessibility
The township is directly accessible via Putra Mahkota Interchange of the KL-Seremban Expressway and other roads.

References

External links 
 Community Forum Bandar Bukit Mahkota
 Lion Group - Developer of Bukit Mahkota

Townships in Selangor